Plastino is an Italian surname. Notable people with the surname include:

Al Plastino (1921–2013), American comics artist
Felix Plastino (1895–1957), American player and coach of college football
Nick Plastino (born 1986), Canadian-born Italian ice hockey player

Italian-language surnames